The Oregon Jack Creek Band is a First Nations government in the Thompson Canyon area of the Southern Interior of the Canadian province of British Columbia.  Its Indian Reserves and offices are located near the town of Ashcroft, it is a member of the Nlaka'pamux Nation Tribal Council.

Other Nlaka'pamux governments belong either to the Nicola Tribal Association or the Fraser Canyon Indian Administration.

See also
Thompson language

References
Indian and Northern Affairs Canada - First Nation Detail

Nlaka'pamux governments
Thompson Country